Dungar College is a government college in the Bikaner city of Indian state of Rajasthan. Courses are offered in science, commerce, and arts . Dungar college is the largest college in Bikaner division.

Notable alumni
 T.D Dogra - former Director of AIIMS, Vice Chancellor of SGT University Gurgaon Hrayana
 Bhagwati Prasad - Chief Justice of Jharkhand High Court
 Dr Karan Singh Yadav - cardiothoracic surgeon and MP from Alwar
 Shri Arjun Ram Meghwal - Union Minister State, Ministry of Parliamentary Affairs; and Ministry of Water Resources, River Development and Ganga Rejuvenation

Notable faculty
 Shyam Sunder Jyani - Associate professor of sociology and environmentalist

References

External links
Official website

Colleges in Bikaner
Educational institutions established in 1912
1912 establishments in India